Mahindra Aerospace is an Indian aerospace company, part of the Mahindra Group. It is the first Indian private firm to make smaller civil aircraft for the Indian general aviation market. It is an AS9100 Rev.D certified design organization.

Acquisitions

The parent Mahindra & Mahindra group acquired a 75.1% majority stake in December 2009 of Australian aircraft manufacturer Gippsland Aeronautics, builder of the Gippsland GA200, Gippsland GA8 Airvan and the Gippsland GA10 Airvan. The company was renamed GippsAero.

Also in December 2009 the Mahindra & Mahindra group also acquired a 75.1% stake in Aerostaff Australia, a component manufacturer of high-precision, close-tolerance, aircraft components and assemblies for large aerospace original equipment manufacturers.

In June 2010 the company acquired the Australian Boeing unit, an aerospace component manufacturer.

Products
National Aerospace Laboratories (NAL) and Mahindra Aerospace jointly developed the NAL NM5 light aircraft.

Manufacturing plants

 Latrobe Regional Airport, Morwell, Victoria, Australia
Narsapura Industrial Area, Kolar District, Karnataka, India

See also
 Central Aircraft Manufacturing Company
 Hindustan Aeronautics Limited
 Tata Advanced Systems

References

External links
 
 Mahindra Aerospace to roll-out first aircraft by March 2011

Aircraft manufacturers of India
Mahindra Group
Manufacturing companies based in Mumbai
Indian companies established in 2003
Vehicle manufacturing companies established in 2003
2003 establishments in Maharashtra